Barnaparichay or Barna Parichay (1855) is a Bengali primer written by 19th century Indian social reformer Ishwar Chandra Vidyasagar. This is considered as "the most influential primer of Bengal". The primer had two parts (part I & part II) and was published. This reflected Vidayasagar's knowledge, expertise and background as a Sanskrit scholar. The success of the first part of the primer inspired Vidyasagar to work on the second part.

References 

Ishwar Chandra Vidyasagar
Bengali-language books
1855 books